The SE (South Eastern) postcode area covers a broad radial swathe of the south-east of the London post town from the Albert Embankment to West Heath and the nearest edges of Sidcup and Selhurst. It loosely corresponds to the boroughs of Southwark, Lewisham and Greenwich plus indicated parts of the boroughs of Croydon (north), Lambeth (east), Bexley (west) and Bromley (its northwest corner).

Postal administration
The postcode area originated in 1857 as the SE district. In 1868 it gained some of the area of the short-lived S district, with the rest going to SW. It was divided into numbered districts in 1917, by giving the district closest to London that hosted the head office the suffix "1" and all others alphabetically based on a locally important parish, chapelry, topological or built environment feature administering or close to the local distribution office. SE28 is a late addition carved out of the existing districts SE2 and SE18 to reflect the building up of a new London district in what had been the meadows and marshes by the tidal Thames in the parish of Plumstead: Thamesmead. 

Unlike SW, where a consecutive 50%, there ten, districts can more officially be traced into two alphabetical groups excluding SW1, SE has always technically followed the norm in that SE1 is the only head district. However SE19 was drawn up to serve the key distribution office serving Norwood after a complete alphabetical series so that those surrounding it and SE21 (Dulwich): SE20 and SE22 to SE27 are strictly alphabetical afresh (Anerley to West Norwood) but it has never technically been a "head district". The postcode area is part of the London post town. There are no dependent localities used in the postcode area. SE1P is a non-geographic postcode district for PO boxes located in SE1.

List of postcode districts
The approximate coverage of the postcode districts, with the historic postal district names shown in italics:

 
|-
! SE1
| LONDON
| South Eastern head district: Bankside, South Bank, Lambeth (part), Southwark, Bermondsey (part), Vauxhall (part), Peckham (part)
| Lambeth, Southwark
|-
! style="background:#FFFFFF;"|SE1P
| style="background:#FFFFFF;"|LONDON
| style="background:#FFFFFF;"|
| style="background:#FFFFFF;"|non-geographic
|-
! SE2
| LONDON
| Abbey Wood district: Abbey Wood, West Heath, Crossness, Thamesmead (part), Plumstead (part), Bostall Heath and Woods
| Greenwich, Bexley
|-
! SE3
| LONDON
| Blackheath district: Blackheath, Kidbrooke, Westcombe Park
| Greenwich, Lewisham
|-
! SE4
| LONDON
| Brockley district: Brockley, Crofton Park, Ladywell, Telegraph Hill
| Lewisham
|-
! SE5
| LONDON
| Camberwell district: Camberwell, Denmark Hill, Peckham
| Lambeth, Southwark
|-
! SE6
| LONDON
| Catford district: Catford, Bellingham, Hither Green (part), Rushey Green
| Lewisham
|-
! SE7
| LONDON
| Charlton district: Charlton
| Greenwich
|-
! SE8
| LONDON
| Deptford district: Deptford, Evelyn, Rotherhithe (part), St John's
| Lewisham, Greenwich, Southwark
|-
! SE9
| LONDON
| Eltham district: Eltham, Mottingham, New Eltham, Well Hall, Avery Hill (part), Falconwood (part), Sidcup (part), Chinbrook (part), Longlands (part) Kidbrooke (part), Shooter's Hill (part)
| Greenwich, Bromley, Bexley, Lewisham
|-
! SE10
| LONDON
| Greenwich district: Greenwich, Maze Hill, Greenwich Peninsula 
| Greenwich, Lewisham
|-
! SE11
| LONDON
| Kennington district: Kennington, Lambeth (part), Vauxhall (part), Oval (part)
| Lambeth, Southwark
|-
! SE12
| LONDON
| Lee district: Lee, Mottingham, Grove Park, Chinbrook, Hither Green (part), Eltham (part), Horn Park
| Lewisham, Greenwich, Bromley 
|-
! SE13
| LONDON
| Lewisham district: Lewisham, Hither Green, Ladywell
| Lewisham, Greenwich
|-
! SE14
| LONDON
| New Cross district: New Cross, Telegraph Hill
| Lewisham
|-
! SE15
| LONDON
| Peckham district: Peckham, Nunhead, South Bermondsey (part)
| Southwark, Lewisham
|-
! SE16
| LONDON
| Rotherhithe district: Rotherhithe (part), Surrey Quays, South Bermondsey (part)
| Southwark, Lewisham
|-
! SE17
| LONDON
| Walworth district: Walworth, Kennington (part), Newington
| Southwark
|-
! SE18
| LONDON
| Woolwich district: Woolwich, Royal Arsenal, Plumstead, Shooter's Hill
| Greenwich
|-
! SE19
| LONDON
| Norwood district: Upper Norwood, Crystal Palace, Gipsy Hill (part)
| Croydon, Lambeth, Southwark, Bromley
|-
! SE20
| LONDON
| Anerley district: Anerley, Crystal Palace (part), Penge, Beckenham (part)
| Bromley
|-
! SE21
| LONDON
| Dulwich district: Dulwich, Dulwich Village, Tulse Hill (part), West Dulwich
| Southwark, Lambeth
|-
! SE22
| LONDON
| East Dulwich district: East Dulwich, Peckham Rye
| Southwark
|-
! SE23
| LONDON
| Forest Hill district: Forest Hill, Honor Oak, Crofton Park (part), Perry Vale
| Lewisham, Southwark
|-
! SE24
| LONDON
| Herne Hill district: Herne Hill, Tulse Hill (part), West Dulwich (part)
| Lambeth, Southwark
|-
! SE25
| LONDON
| South Norwood district: South Norwood, Selhurst (part), Thornton Heath (part), Woodside (part)
| Croydon
|-
! SE26
| LONDON
| Sydenham district: Sydenham, Crystal Palace (part)
| Lewisham, Bromley, Southwark
|-
! SE27
| LONDON
| West Norwood district: West Norwood, Gipsy Hill (part), Tulse Hill (part)
| Lambeth
|-
! SE28
| LONDON
| Thamesmead district: Thamesmead
| Greenwich, Bexley 
|}

Boundaries
SE1 has a very long tidal Thames frontage and is in Central London as is SE11 named after Kennington, close to Westminster. SE2–SE18 spread across the north and east of the postcode area; enquiring into their naming system explains how SE2, SE7, SE8, SE10, SE16 and SE18 also front the river. Postcode districts SE19–SE27 form a group in the southwest.  Addition SE28 is in the northeast corner of the first group. The postcode area maps roughly to the combined area of the London Borough of Southwark, London Borough of Lewisham and Royal Borough of Greenwich. the eastern part of the London Borough of Lambeth, the northern part of the London Borough of Croydon, the western part of the London Borough of Bexley and the northwestern part of the London Borough of Bromley are within the postcode area.

In 2002, some residents in West Heath, a slight projection with neighbouring areas, wished to have their postcodes changed from SE2 to the adjacent DA7 postcode district, citing higher insurance for their houses, belongings and cars as reasons to change. Royal Mail has said it will not consider changes to postcodes for these reasons.

Map

See also
Postcode Address File
List of postcode areas in the United Kingdom
London postal district

References

External links
Royal Mail's Postcode Address File
A quick introduction to Royal Mail's Postcode Address File (PAF)

Postcode areas covering London
Media and communications in the London Borough of Bexley
Media and communications in the London Borough of Bromley
Media and communications in the London Borough of Croydon
Media and communications in the Royal Borough of Greenwich
Media and communications in the London Borough of Lambeth
Media and communications in the London Borough of Lewisham
Media and communications in the London Borough of Southwark